The expression sexual intercourse has been used as a legal term of art in England and Wales. From its enactment to its repeal on the 1 May 2004, section 44 of the Sexual Offences Act 1956 read:

Unnatural

This expression referred to buggery (including both buggery with a person and buggery with an animal).

Penetration

According to cases decided on the meaning of the statutory definition of carnal knowledge under the Offences against the Person Act 1828, which was in identical terms to this definition, the slightest penetration was sufficient. The book "Archbold" said that it "submitted" that this continued to be the law under the new enactment.

See also R v Hughes (1841) 9 C & P 752, (1841) 2 Mood CC 190 and R v Lines (1844) 1 Car & Kir 393.

Continuing act

See Kaitamaki v R [1985] AC 147, [1984] 3 WLR 137, [1984] 2 All ER 435, 79 Cr App R 251, [1984] Crim LR 564, PC (decided under equivalent legislation in New Zealand).

Other definitions

Section 7(2) of the Sexual Offences (Amendment) Act 1976 contained the following words: "In this Act . . . references to sexual intercourse shall be construed in accordance with section 44 of the Sexual Offences Act 1956 so far as it relates to natural intercourse (under which such intercourse is deemed complete on proof of penetration only)". The Act made provision, in relation to rape and related offences, for England and Wales, and for courts-martial elsewhere.

From 3 November 1994 to 1 May 2004, section 1(2)(a) of the Sexual Offences Act 1956 (as substituted by section 142 of the Criminal Justice and Public Order Act 1994) referred to "sexual intercourse with a person (whether vaginal or anal)". This section created the offence of rape in England and Wales.

Unlawful sexual intercourse

In R v Chapman, the court considered section 19 of the Sexual Offences Act 1956 and held that sexual intercourse was "unlawful" if it was extra-marital.

Consortium

Sexual intercourse is an incident of consortium.

Human rights

Article 12 of the Convention for the Protection of Human Rights and Fundamental Freedoms does not confer on prisoners a right to conjugal relations whilst in prison.

References
Card, Richard. Card, Cross and Jones: Criminal Law. 12th ed. Butterworths. 1992. Paras 12.2 and 12.9.
Barnett, Hilaire. Constitutional and Administrative Law. Second Edition. Cavendish. 1998. Page 829.

English law